The Archery Association of Singapore is the National Sports Association for the sport of archery in Singapore.

It is a member association with the world governing body for archery, World Archery Federation.

Its current president is Edelin Wong.

References

External links
 

Singapore
Archery in Singapore
Sports governing bodies in Singapore